Presidential elections were held in Slovenia on 23 November 1997. The result was a victory for incumbent Milan Kučan, who won 55.54% of the vote. Voter turnout was 68.65%.

Results

References

Slovenia
1997 in Slovenia
Presidential elections in Slovenia
December 1997 events in Europe